Newton-with-Scales is a village in the county of Lancashire and in the Borough of Fylde. 
It has a park situated on School Lane, a restaurant / pub called the Bell and Bottle, a primary school called Newton Bluecoats, a shop called The convenience store which also has a Post Office. On the main road out of the village you will also find a Petrol Station and an Indian Restaurant called Ali Raj.

Formerly the village was two hamlets: Scales on the main road from Preston to Kirkham, and Newton on a loop to the south. The name Newton is from Old English, meaning "new farm" or "new village"; Scales is from a word of Scandinavian origin meaning "hut".

Newton was mentioned in the Domesday Book as a member of the fee of Earl Tostig. By 1212 it had become part of the barony of Penwortham. In the 16th century both Newton and Scales were referred to as manors. Newton Bluecoat school was established in 1707 by John Hornby for boys and girls up to the age of 14 years; it is now a primary school. It was rebuilt in 1864, and replaced by a new building in 1969.

The township of Newton-with-Scales was part of the parish of Kirkham; by 1912 it had its own parish council and formed part of Fylde Rural District. Located east of Freckleton and west of Clifton, the township extended north from the River Ribble to boundaries with Kirkham to the north-west and Treales, Roseacre and Wharles to the north. It included the hamlet of Dowbridge on the main road near Kirkham. As of 1912 it consisted of 1,522 acres (including around 15 acres of tidal water in the Ribble estuary). Most of the area was pasture. The southern part, crossed by the Preston to Freckleton road, is flat and includes reclaimed land close to the river; the village is to the north on a slope that rises to 50 feet.  As of the 1931 census the civil parish of Newton-with-Scales had a population of 343. In 1934 it merged with Clifton-with-Salwick (1931 census population: 428) to form Newton-with-Clifton.

Formerly a rural community, it has expanded with many new houses built since the 1940s. Since World War II, Springfields nuclear fuel production site and British Aerospace at Warton Aerodrome have been major employers in the area, and also by the 1980s many residents worked in Preston, Blackpool and other towns in the region.

Nearby towns and villages
 Clifton
 Freckleton
 Kirkham
 Preston
 Salwick
 Wrea Green
 Blackpool

See also
Listed buildings in Newton-with-Clifton

References

External link

Villages in Lancashire
Geography of the Borough of Fylde